August Holmgren may refer to:

 August Holmgren (zoologist) (1829–1888), Swedish entomologist
 August Holmgren (tennis) (born 1998), Danish tennis player